Daland Rural District is a rural district (dehestan) in the Central District of Ramian County, Golestan Province, Iran. At the 2006 census, its population was 25,106, in 5,858 families.  The rural district has 26 villages.

References 

Rural Districts of Golestan Province
Ramian County